Syntomodrillia cookei is a species of sea snail, a marine gastropod mollusk in the family Drilliidae.

Description
The fusiform shell grows to a length of 8.5 mm.

Distribution
This species occurs in the benthic zone of the Caribbean Sea (Jamaica, Colombia, Costa Rica, Mexico, Puerto Rico), the Gulf of Mexico (Florida to Texas), Guadeloupe and the western Atlantic Ocean (northern Brazil)

References

 Smith, E.A. (1888) "Diagnoses of new species of Pleurotomidae in the British Museum". The Annals and Magazine of Natural History: Including Zoology, Botany, and Geology. 6th ser. v.2. p. 308.
 Rosenberg, G., F. Moretzsohn, and E. F. García. 2009. Gastropoda (Mollusca) of the Gulf of Mexico, Pp. 579–699 in Felder, D.L. and D.K. Camp (eds.), Gulf of Mexico–Origins, Waters, and Biota. Biodiversity. Texas A&M Press, College Station, Texas

External links
 
 Tucker, J.K. 2004 "Catalog of recent and fossil turrids (Mollusca: Gastropoda)". Zootaxa. 682:1-1295.
 Fallon P.J. (2016). "Taxonomic review of tropical western Atlantic shallow water Drilliidae (Mollusca: Gastropoda: Conoidea) including descriptions of 100 new species". Zootaxa. 4090(1): 1–363.
 De Jong K.M. & Coomans H.E. (1988) Marine gastropods from Curaçao, Aruba and Bonaire. Leiden: E.J. Brill. 261 pp. 

cookei
Gastropods described in 1888